"The Wind That Shakes the Barley" is an Irish ballad written by Robert Dwyer Joyce (1836–1883), a Limerick-born poet and professor of English literature. The song is written from the perspective of a doomed young Wexford rebel who is about to sacrifice his relationship with his loved one and plunge into the cauldron of violence associated with the 1798 rebellion in Ireland. The references to barley in the song derive from the fact that the rebels frequently carried barley or oats in their pockets as provisions for when on the march. This gave rise to the post-rebellion phenomenon of barley growing and marking the "croppy-holes," unmarked mass graves into which rebel casualties were thrown in. To many Irish nationalists, these "croppy-holes" symbolised the regenerative nature of resistance to British rule in Ireland. Barley growing every spring was said by nationalists authors to symbolize continuous Irish resistance to British rule, particularly in nationalist literature and poetry written about the rebellion.

The song is no. 2994 in the Roud Folk Song Index, having existed in different forms in the oral tradition since its composition. Traditional Irish singers including Sarah Makem have performed the song. There are numerous small variations in different traditional versions, and many performers leave out the fourth stanza of Dwyer Joyce's original version. The song's title was borrowed for Ken Loach's 2006 film of the same name, which features the song in one scene. The song should not be confused with the reel of the same name.

Lyrics
The lyrics below are as those printed in the original 1861 version.
I sat within a valley green,
I sat there with my true love,
My sad heart strove the two between,
The old love and the new love, -
The old for her, the new that made
Me think of Ireland dearly,
While soft the wind blew down the glade
And shook the golden barley

'Twas hard the woeful words to frame
To break the ties that bound us
'Twas harder still to bear the shame
Of foreign chains around us
And so I said, "The mountain glen
I'll seek next morning early
And join the brave United Men!"
While soft winds shook the barley

While sad I kissed away her tears,
My fond arms 'round her flinging,
The foeman's shot burst on our ears,
From out the wildwood ringing, -
A bullet pierced my true love's side,
In life's young spring so early,
And on my breast in blood she died
While soft winds shook the barley!

I bore her to the wildwood screen,
And many a summer blossom
I placed with branches thick and green
Above her gore-stain'd bosom:-
I wept and kissed her pale, pale cheek,
Then rushed o'er vale and far lea,
My vengeance on the foe to wreak,
While soft winds shook the barley!

But blood for blood without remorse,
I've ta'en at Oulart Hollow
And placed my true love's clay-cold corpse
Where I full soon will follow;
And 'round her grave I wander drear,
Noon, night, and morning early,
With breaking heart whene'er I hear
The wind that shakes the barley!

Cover versions

The song has been covered by many artists, including Declan Hunt Finvarra, Loreena McKennitt, The Dubliners, Dolores Keane, Dead Can Dance (sung by Lisa Gerrard), Altan, Solas, The Clancy Brothers and Tommy Makem, Dick Gaughan, Orthodox Celts, Amanda Palmer, Fire + Ice, The Irish Rovers (as "The Wind That Shakes the Corn"), Sarah Jezebel Deva, Martin Carthy, Declan de Barra, Belfast Food, Poets of the Fall, Glow, Yanisovsky, and Lumiere.

Other uses of the name
 Seán Keating chose the title for a 1941 painting.
 A poem by the same name was published by Katharine Tynan.
 This is also the name of a fast Irish reel.
 The Wind That Shakes the Barley is also a novel by James Barke about the Scots poet Robert Burns; it was published in 1946, the first of a quintet of novels on the subject.
 A studio album from Loreena McKennitt published in 2010.
 A song of the same name appears on UK progressive rock band It Bites' comeback album The Tall Ships, released in 2008.
 "The Wind that Shakes the Barley" is also the third song on the "Dead Can Dance" album Into the Labyrinth, where the poem is sung by Lisa Gerrard.
 "The Wind that Shakes the Barley" occurs in the refrain of the song "Harvest of the Moon" on the album "The Journey" by Steeleye Span.

Popular culture
A short section of the song is heard being sung by Micheál Ó Súilleabháin's grandmother Peggy at his wake in the 2006 film of the same name.

References

Ballads of the Irish Rebellion of 1798
Irish songs
19th-century Irish literature
1861 songs
1861 poems
Irish poems